Jung Mo Sung (born 1957) is a Roman Catholic lay theologian trained in theology, ethics, and education. 

He works within the paradigm of liberation theology and can be considered a "next generation" theologian-practitioner.  He has served as an informal associate of the "DEI School," a research institute in Costa Rica where scholars such as Pablo Richard, Elsa Támez, and Franz Hinkelammert are currently working. He is particularly concerned with the relation between theology and the economy as well as education theory in view of solidarity. 

Though he may be viewed as rejecting the idea that some sort of historical subject, whether God, the proletariat, or even a particular set of social institutions, will bring into history the utopian dream of a truly just, peaceful, and harmonious society, he is not passive in the face of injustice. Sung has worked directly with basic ecclesial communities as an advisor, speaking regularly at various ecumenical events that focus on justice and solidarity, and writing scholarly books as well as those aimed directly at those laypersons who are involved in particular struggles for justice. He speaks about justice with the same ferociousness as most liberation theologians, but tempers his evaluations of struggles, projects, and proposals with a sense of what may be temporally attainable.

Early life
Sung was born in Seoul, South Korea as the eldest son of Sung Nak-cheon (성낙천; 成洛天). He attended the Samcheong Elementary School there before moving to Paraná, Brazil with his family in 1966. He has remained there ever since. 

Sung received his undergraduate degree in philosophy in 1984, a doctorate in religious studies in 1993 (from the Methodist University of São Paulo, under the direction of Júlio de Santa Ana), and did post-doctoral work in education in 2000 (at the Methodist University of Piracicaba with Hugo Assmann).

Employment
Sung is currently a professor in the graduate program of religious studies at the prestigious Methodist University of São Paulo, where he has been teaching since 1994. From 1996 to 2006 he was also a professor in the graduate program at the Pontifical Catholic University of São Paulo.

Impact abroad
Several of Sung's texts have been translated into Italian, Spanish, Korean, English, and German. He is gradually gaining prominence and exposure in the United States, speaking, for example, twice in the last three years at the annual national meeting of the American Academy of Religion (a large convention with over 11,000 participants).

See also Ivan Petrella's The Future of Liberation Theology (SCM Press, 2006) and his edited volume of articles, Latin American Liberation Theology: The Next Generation (Orbis Books, 2005). The latter volume, Petrella states, "opens with Jung Mo Sung, the most prolific next-generation voice within mainstream contemporary Latin American liberation theology" (p. xvi).  Dr. Petrella employed Sung's critique of earlier liberation theologians in his own article "Queer Eye for the Straight Guy: The Making Over of Liberation Theology, A Queer Discursive Approach" in Liberation Theology and Sexuality, ed. Marcella Althaus-Reid (Ashgate, 2006 [expanded pb. ed., 2009]), pp. 33–49.

Publication of Desire, Market and Religion in 2007 brought Sung's work into English as the sole author of a book-length project for the first time.  It was followed by Beyond the Spirit of Empire: Theology and Politics in a New Key in 2009, a book co-authored with Nestor Miguez and Joerg Rieger in SCM's "Reclaiming Liberation Theology" Series.

Referred to

Jung Mo Sung's work has been predominantly influential in Spanish- and Portuguese-language academic discourse in Latin America. However, his work has also been discussed in international publications, including:

"The Future of Liberation Theology: An Argument and Manifesto" by Ivan Petrella
Latin American Perspectives on Globalization: Ethics, Politics" by Mario Sáenz
Liberation Theology And Sexuality" by Marcella Althaus-Reid
"The encyclopedia of Christianity" by Erwin Fahlbusch, et al.
"Religion in the New Millennium: Theology in the Spirit of Paul Tillich" by Raymond F. Bulman, Frederick J. Parrella
"Interpreting the Postmodern: Responses to "Radical Orthodoxy"" by Rosemary Radford Ruether, Marion Grau
"The War of Gods: Religion and Politics in Latin America" by Michael Lowy
"Liberation Theologies on Shifting Grounds" by Georges de Schrijver
"Christ & Empire: From Paul to Postcolonial Times" by Joerg Rieger
"The Blackwell Companion to the Bible and Culture" by John F. A. Sawyer
"Global Ethics And Civil Society" by John Eade, Darren J. O'Byrne
"Out of the Depths: Women's Experience of Evil and Salvation" by Ivone Gebara
"In Search of the Good Life: The Ethics of Globalization" by Rebecca Todd Peters
"Religion in a Secular City: Essays in Honor of Harvey Cox" by Harvey Gallagher Cox, Arvind Sharma
"An Introduction to Third World Theologies" by John Parratt
"Liberation Theologies, Postmodernity, and the Americas" by David Batstone
"Theologies in the Old Testament" by Erhard S. Gerstenberger
"Moral Theology: New Directions and Fundamental Issues" by James Keating

Publications

English
The Subject, Capitalism and Religion: Horizons of Hope in Complex Society. New York: Palgrave Macmillan, 2011.
Beyond the Spirit of Empire: Theology and Politics in a New Key by Joerg Rieger Page, Jung Mo Sung, and Nestor Miguez. SCM Reclaiming Liberation Theology Series, 2009.
Desire, Market, and Religion, SCM Press Reclaiming Liberation Theology Series, 2007.
"Theology, Spirituality, and the Market," in: Another Possible World, eds. Marcella Althaus-Reid, Ivan Petrella, and Luiz Carlos Susin. SCM Press, 2007.
"What Is Behind the Notification of Jon Sobrino?" in Getting the Poor Down from the Cross: Christology of Liberation, José María VIGIL (organizer), International Theological Commission of the Ecumenical Association of Third World Theologians, 2007.
"The Human Being as Subject: Defending the Victims," in: Latin American Liberation Theology: The Next Generation, ed. Ivan Petrella. Orbis Books, 2005.
"Economics and Theology: Reflections on the Market, Globalization, and the Kingdom of God," in: Global Capitalism, Liberation Theology and the Social Sciences, eds. P. M. Zulehner, A. Tausch, A. Müller. Nova Science, 2000.
"Hunger For God, Hunger For Bread, Hunger For Humanity," in: Hope and Justice for All in the Americas: Discerning God's Mission, ed. Oscar Bolioli. New York: Friendship Press, 1998.

Portuguese
Direitos humanos e amor ao próximo: textos teológicos em diálogo com a vida real. São Paulo: Recriar, 2020. (with Ivone Gebara)
Idolatria do dinheiro e direitos humanos: uma crítica teológica do novo mito do capitalismo. São Paulo: Paulus, 2018. 
A graça de Deus e a loucura do mundo. São Paulo: Reflexão, 2016. (ISBN 978-85-8088-153-0, 191 pp.)
Para além do espírito do Império. São Paulo: Paulinas, 2012. (with Néstor Míguez and Joerg Rieger)
Missão e educação teológica. São Paulo: ASTE, 2011 (with Néstor Miguez and Lauri Wirth)
Deus em nós: o reinado que acontece no amor solidário aos pobres" (with Hugo Assmann), Paulus, 2010.
Cristianismo de Libertação", Paulus, 2008.
Um Caminho Espiritual para a Felicidade, Vozes, 2007.
Educar para Reencantar a Vida, Vozes, 2006.
Sementes de Esperança: A Fé em um Mundo em Crise, Vozes, 2005.
Competência e Sensibilidade Solidária: Educar para Esperança, with Hugo Assmann, Vozes, 2000.
Conversando sobre Ética e Sociedade, Vozes, 1995.
Teologia e Economia: Repensando A Teologia da Libertação e Utopias, Vozes, 1994.
Deus Numa Economia Sem Coração. Neoliberalismo e Pobreza: Desafios À Evangelização, Paulus, 1992.

References

External links
Jung Mo Sung's Resume.
Jung Mo Sung's article "The Human Being as Subject: Defending the Victims."
Jung Mo Sung's article "What Is Behind the Notification of Jon Sobrino?" in Getting the Poor Down from the Cross: Christology of Liberation, (book downloadable in English, Italian or Portuguese) with prologue by Leonardo Boff.
Jung Mo Sung's contribution noted by Claudio de Oliveira Ribeiro in "Has Liberation Theology Died? Reflections on the Relationship between Community Life and the Globalization of the Economic System."
DEI School in Costa Rica

1957 births
Brazilian non-fiction writers
Brazilian Roman Catholic theologians
Living people
South Korean emigrants to Brazil
Liberation theologians
Methodist University of São Paulo alumni